The Great Chronicle of Limoges, also called the Chronicle of Saint-Martial of Limoges, is a collection of 13th- and 14th-century historical notices and chronicles of Limoges preserved in three related manuscripts. Beginning in the 18th century, the material in the manuscripts was mistakenly perceived as fragments of a single large chronicle of the abbey of Saint-Martial. They were first critically edited as a unified chronicle in the 19th century. They are today recognized mostly as notes made by the monks of Saint-Martial as continuations of the copious historical notes made by Bernard Itier (died 1225).

The three manuscripts from which the Great Chronicle is derived are all now in the Bibliothèque nationale de France:
MS lat. 11019, historical notes added to the margins from 1310 at Saint-Martial
MS lat. 5452, compiled in the abbey of Saint-Martin in the late 14th or early 15th century
MS lat. 12764, copied by the Maurist Claude Estiennot de la Serre in the 17th century

All three manuscripts contain many texts in common, including the chronicle of Saint-Martin by its abbot, Pierre Coral. The first continuation of Bernard Itier, begun in 1310, covers the period 1207–1320, which overlaps with Itier's own notes for the years 1207–1224. The focus of the text is Limoges and Saint-Martial and it begins with the arrival in the city of Franciscans and Dominicans. Two other continuations of Itier's notes made by Hélie Autenc are also included. They cover 1235–1277 and 1274–1315. The first of these relies on the universal chronicle of Gerald Frachet, but the focus of both remains local. There is also a rough attempt at a chronicle covering the years 1235–1299, entitled Brevissimum chronicon in modern editions.

There is no single published edition of all the texts in the three manuscripts, but most of the material has been published.

Notes

Bibliography

Limoges
13th-century Latin literature